Patriarch Elias I may refer to:

 Elias I of Jerusalem, Patriarch in 494–516
 Patriarch Elias I of Alexandria, Greek Patriarch of Alexandria in 963–1000
 Elias Peter Hoayek, Maronite Patriarch in 1898–1931